Henrietta may refer to:

 Henrietta (given name), a feminine given name, derived from the male name Henry

Places 
 Henrietta Island in the Arctic Ocean
 Henrietta, Mauritius
 Henrietta, Tasmania, a locality in Australia

United States
 Henrietta, Missouri
 Henrietta, Johnson County, Missouri
 Henrietta, New York
 Henrietta, Ohio
 Henrietta, Pennsylvania
 Henrietta, Texas
 Henrietta, West Virginia
 Henrietta, Wisconsin, a county subdivision
 Henrietta (ghost town), Wisconsin, a ghost town
 Henrietta Township:
 Henrietta Township, Michigan
 Henrietta Township, Hubbard County, Minnesota
 Henrietta Township, Lorain County, Ohio
 Henrietta Township, LaMoure County, North Dakota

Fictional characters 
 Henrietta de Tristain a fictional character from the Japanese light novel/anime Zero no Tsukaima
 Henrietta the coach, a fictional character of The Railway Series
 Henrietta (Gunslinger), a fictional character from the Japanese manga/anime Gunslinger Girl
Henrietta Coles, the main protagonist of YouTube's online television show Impulse
Ms. Henrietta Vanderpeen, character on Bear in the Big Blue House
Henrietta Twombly, a character on Littlest Pet Shop

Other 
 225 Henrietta, an asteroid
 Henrietta (novel),a novel by Charlotte Lennox published in 1758
 Henrietta (film), a 1983 Swedish film based on book of the same name by Stig Claesson
 "Henrietta" (song), a single by the Scottish band The Fratellis
 Henrietta the four-legged chicken, a famous animal with a birth defect
 Henrietta Barnett School, Hampstead Garden Suburb, London, England, a top girls' school
 Nickname for Jon Fishman of the band Phish
 Henrietta Award, a retired Golden Globe Award category given to actors from 1950 to 1979
 Henrietta (ship, 1861), Yacht schooner designed and built in 1861 by Henry Steers for James Gordon Bennett Jr.

See also
 
 Henriette (disambiguation)